The women's heptathlon event at the 2010 World Junior Championships in Athletics was held in Moncton, New Brunswick, Canada, at Moncton Stadium on 22 and 23 July.

Medalists

Results

Final
22/23 July

Participation
According to an unofficial count, 24 athletes from 18 countries participated in the event.

References

Heptathlon
Combined events at the World Athletics U20 Championships
2010 in women's athletics